Kianu Kereru-Symes (born 28 February 1999) is a New Zealand rugby union player, who currently plays as a hooker for  in New Zealand's domestic National Provincial Championship competition and the New England Free Jacks in Major League Rugby (MLR) in the United States.

Personal life and early career

Kereru-Symes hails from Māhia, in the Hawke's Bay region on the east coast of New Zealand's North Island. His cousin Paul Symes also played 2 games for the Magpies in 1998–1999, represented  and played for the Central Vikings.

Kereru-Symes attended Hastings Boys' High School, where he captained and played for the school's First XV rugby team, alongside future  teammates Folau Fakatava, Devan Flanders, Lincoln McClutchie and Danny Toala. He started at loosehead prop for Hastings Boys' in their first National Top 4 final against Mount Albert Grammar School in 2016, but had to leave the field with a suspected concussion after 15 minutes. Hastings Boys' narrowly lost that final 13–14. In 2017, he captained the team to a National Top 4 victory, beating Hamilton Boys' High School 25 to 17 in the final after an undefeated season.

He played representative rugby for several Hawke's Bay age grade teams, including at U13, U14, U16 and U19 level.

Both in 2016 and 2017, Kereru-Symes was named in the Hurricanes U18 team to play the Crusaders U18 team in their annual game.

Senior career

While he played at prop during his First XV days, Kereru-Symes switched to hooker after he left school.

Kereru-Symes was, for the first time, named in the  squad for the 2018 Mitre 10 Cup season. He made his debut for the provincevia the benchon 8 September 2018 against  and earned his first start five days later against . He scored his first try for the Magpies on 22 September 2018 against . At the end of his first season, on 23 October 2018, he won the Magpies Players Player of the Year award and Rookie of the Year award at the team's end-of-season awards function.

From his first season, Kereru-Symes established himself as a reliable back-up for regular starting Magpies hooker Ash Dixon. His excellent performance for Hawke's Bay in 2018 lead to him being named in the  U20 team in 2019. He also played for the Hurricanes Development team.

The following year, he was part of the wider  squad and trained withand played forthe franchise during preseason. He played for the  A team, but didn't get any game time in Super Rugby.

He was named on the reserves bench, but didn't get game time. He made his Super Rugby debut three days later, on Tuesday 12 April 2022, when he started for the Hurricanes against . He scored a try on debut.

On 9 January 2023, the New England Free Jacks announced the signing of Kereru-Symes ahead of the 2023 Major League Rugby season. He made his debut for the sidevia the reserves bench on 11 March 2023 against Old Glory DC.

International career

In 2016, following his successful First XV season playing for Hastings Boys' High School, Kereru-Symes was named in the New Zealand Barbarians Schools' team that played matches against Australian Schools and Fiji Schools. He played at loosehead prop in both games. A year later, he was again invited to attend the New Zealand Schools development camp, but was unavailable for selection for the New Zealand Secondary Schools team due to injury.

Kereru-Symes was the captain of the New Zealand Under-20 side that competed in the 2019 Oceania Rugby Under 20 Championship and the 2019 World Rugby Under 20 Championship.

Reference list

External links
NZ Rugby History profile
itsrugby.co.uk profile

1999 births
Living people
Ngāti Rongomaiwahine people
Ngāti Kahungunu people
People educated at Hastings Boys' High School
New Zealand rugby union players
New Zealand Māori rugby union players
Rugby union players from the Hawke's Bay Region
Rugby union hookers
Rugby union props
Hawke's Bay rugby union players
Hurricanes (rugby union) players
New England Free Jacks players